Avtozavodskaya Line is a line of the Nizhny Novgorod Metro and bears the abbreviation M1. The line opened in 1985 and crosses the city on a northwest-southeast axis. The train station Moskovskaya is the second station, which does not cross, but only touches.

History 
The construction of the line began on December 17, 1977. On this day, the first piles were driven into the base of the station Leninskaya. A commemorative sign was erected on the site of the construction (letter M in the tunnel). In September 1978 tunneling began from the station Leninskaya. July 13, 1984 in the pit of the station Moskovskaya collapsed walls. Two workers from the student brigade, who helped with the construction of the metro, died. There is a legend that the ghosts of dead students are still walking through tunnels and metro stations.

November 20, 1985, the grand opening of the Line 1 of the Gorky Metro was held. The launch complex of the first section included a 7.8 km long line with six stations: Moskovskaya, Chkalovskaya, Leninskaya, Zarechnaya, Dvigatel Revolyutsii and Proletarskaya; Depot and engineering building. In 1987, two more stations were opened - Avtozavodskaya and Komsomolskaya from the Proletarskaya station, and in 1989 - Kirovskaya and Park Kultury. November 4, 2012, the Gorkovskaya station of the Line 1 in the Upper City was opened.

Timeline

Stations and connections

References 

Nizhny Novgorod Metro lines
Railway lines opened in 1985